Diodone was a radiocontrast agent used in urography. It was usually formulated as a salt with diethanolamine.

It is not known to be marketed anywhere in the world in 2021.

See also
 Iodinated contrast

References 

Radiocontrast agents
Carboxylic acids
Iodoarenes